The Cabinet of Victoria oversees Victoria's executive branch of Government. Ministers of the cabinet undertake extra responsibilities inline with their portfolio area and are responsible for the subordinate government departments relevant to their ministry positions.

Current arrangement

See also
Third Andrews ministry
Shadow cabinet of Victoria

Reference list

External links  
 Cabinet Directory

Victoria (Australia) ministries